Magda is a feminine given name, sometimes a short form (hypocorism) of names such as Magdalena, which may refer to:

 Magda Apanowicz (born 1985), Canadian actress
 Magda B. Arnold (1903–2002), Czechoslovakian-born American psychologist
 Magda Danysz (born 1974), French art curator and art dealer
 Magda Davitt, name in 2017 of Sinéad O'Connor (born 1966), Irish singer-songwriter
 Magda Femme, Polish pop singer and songwriter born Magdalena Pokora in 1971
 Magdolna Magda Gabor (1915–1997), Hungarian-American actress and socialite
 Magda Gerber (1910–2007), Hungarian-born early childhood educator in the United States
 Magda Giannikou (born 1981), Greek-born composer, film scorer, singer, pianist and accordionist
 Johanna Maria Magdalena Magda Goebbels (1901–1945), wife of Nazi Germany's Minister of Propaganda Joseph Goebbels
 María Magdalena Magda Guzmán (1931–2015), Mexican film and television actress
 Magda Ianculescu (1929–1995), Romanian operatic soprano and voice teacher
 Magda Konopka (born 1943), Polish model and actress
 Magda Lupescu (1899–1977), later Princess Elena of Romania, mistress and later wife of King Carol II of Romania
 Magda Mihalache (born 1981), Romanian tennis player
 Magda Popeanu (born 1956), Romanian-born Canadian politician 
 Magda al-Sabahi (1931–2020), Egyptian film actress
 Magdalena Magda Schneider (1909–1996), German actress and singer
 Magda Szabó (1917–2007), Hungarian writer, poet and doctor of philology
 Magdalene Magda Szubanski (born 1961), Australian television and film actress, comedian and writer
 Magda Umer (born 1949), Polish singer
 Magdalena Magda Wierzycka (born 1969), South African billionaire businesswoman

Fictional characters
 Magda Miłowicz, title character of Magda M., a Polish soap opera (2005–2007)

Feminine given names
Romanian feminine given names
Hypocorisms